Bourgvallées is a commune in the department of Manche, northwestern France. The municipality was established on 1 January 2016 by merger of the former communes of Gourfaleur, La Mancellière-sur-Vire, Saint-Romphaire and Saint-Samson-de-Bonfossé (the seat). On 1 January 2019, the former communes Le Mesnil-Herman and Soulles were merged into Bourgvallées.

See also 
Communes of the Manche department

References 

Communes of Manche
Populated places established in 2016
2016 establishments in France